This is a list of the members of the 6th Seanad Éireann, the upper house of the Oireachtas (legislature) of Ireland. These Senators were elected or appointed in 1948, after the 1948 general election and served until the close of poll for the 7th Seanad in 1951.

Composition of the 6th Seanad
There are a total of 60 seats in the Seanad. 43 Senators are elected by the Vocational panels, 6 elected by the Universities and 11 are nominated by the Taoiseach.

The following table shows the composition by party when the 6th Seanad first met on 21 April 1948.

List of senators

Changes

See also
Members of the 13th Dáil
Government of the 13th Dáil

References

External links

 
06